Qaleh Juq-e Sadat (also Romanized as Qal‘eh Jūq-e Sādāt; also known as Qal‘eh Jūq) is a village in Anguran Rural District, Anguran District, Mahneshan County, Zanjan Province, Iran. At the 2006 census, its population was 179, in 36 families.

References 

Populated places in Mahneshan County